Bujar Çani (7 October 1946 – 17 September 2012) was an Albanian footballer. He played in nine matches for the Albania national football team from 1970 to 1972.

References

External links
 

1946 births
2012 deaths
Albanian footballers
Albania international footballers
Place of birth missing
Association football defenders
FK Partizani Tirana players